The 2005 Japanese motorcycle Grand Prix was the twelfth round of the 2005 MotoGP Championship. It took place on the weekend of 16–18 September 2005 at the Twin Ring Motegi citcuit.
In the 250cc Class Jorge Lorenzo was handed a 1 race ban for riding in a irresponsible manner.

MotoGP classification

250 cc classification

125 cc classification
The race, scheduled to be run for 21 laps, was stopped after 15 full laps due to an accident and did not restart as two thirds of the race distance had been completed.

Championship standings after the race (motoGP)

Below are the standings for the top five riders and constructors after round twelve has concluded.

Riders' Championship standings

Constructors' Championship standings

 Note: Only the top five positions are included for both sets of standings.

References

Japanese motorcycle Grand Prix
Japanese
Motorcycle Grand Prix